Christopher Jack Latham (born 6 February 1994) is an English cyclist from Bolton, who most recently rode for UCI Continental team . In 2015 he won the bronze medal in the elimination race at the 2015 UEC European Track Championships in Grenchen, Switzerland.

Career
He spent three seasons riding for the  team before joining  for 2018. Latham joined  for the 2019 season. He remained with the team until the end of the 2020 season, when he joined  for the 2021 season.

Major results

Track

2011
 2nd Kilo, National Junior Championships
2012
 National Junior Championships
1st  Individual pursuit
1st  Points race
3rd Scratch
 UEC European Junior Championships
2nd  Scratch
2nd  Team pursuit
 2nd Team pursuit, National Championships
2013
 2nd Omnium, National Championships
2014
 National Championships
1st  Team pursuit
3rd Scratch
2015
 1st  Team pursuit, UEC European Under-23 Championships
 UCI World Cup
2nd Omnium, Cambridge
3rd Team pursuit, Cali
 2nd Six Days of London (with Oliver Wood)
 3rd  Elimination race, UEC European Championships
 National Championships
3rd Points race
3rd Scratch
2016
 UCI World Cup
2nd Scratch, Apeldoorn
3rd Team pursuit, Hong Kong
2017
 3rd  Scratch, UCI World Championships
2018
 3rd  Scratch, Commonwealth Games

Road

2014
 1st Spiere-Helkijn
2015
 1st Beaumont Trophy
 10th Overall Tour de Berlin
2016
 1st Stage 5 Olympia's Tour
 2nd Omloop Mandel-Leie-Schelde
 3rd Grand Prix Pino Cerami
 4th Antwerpse Havenpijl
 7th Paris–Tours Espoirs
2017
 1st East Cleveland–Klondike GP
 4th Velothon Wales

References

External links

1994 births
English male cyclists
Living people
Sportspeople from Bolton
British male cyclists
British track cyclists
Commonwealth Games medallists in cycling
Commonwealth Games bronze medallists for England
Cyclists at the 2018 Commonwealth Games
21st-century British people
Medallists at the 2018 Commonwealth Games